Steal Nouvel FC de Sima is a football (soccer) club from the Comoros based in Sima.

Achievements
Comoros Premier League
Runner-up (1): 2008/09

Comoros Cup
Winner (1): 2010/11

Anjouan Championship
Champion (2): 2009, 2011

Performance in UAFA competitions
UAFA Cup: 1 appearance
2012–13 – 1st Round

Current Players

External links
Teams's profile – kooora.com

References

Football clubs in the Comoros